Glen Paige Condren (born June 10, 1942) is a former American football  defensive lineman in the National Football League. He played college football for the Oklahoma Sooners. Condren was selected in both the 1964 NFL Draft (by the New York Giants in the 11th round (152nd overall)) and the 1964 American Football League Draft (by the New York Jets in the 19th round (147th overall)). He played seven seasons for the NFL's New York Giants (1965–1967) and the Atlanta Falcons (1969–1972). Glen also played minor league football with the (Huntsville) Alabama Hawks of the Continental Football League. Married to Sheila Condren.

References

1942 births
Living people
Sportspeople from Fort Smith, Arkansas
Players of American football from Arkansas
American football defensive linemen
Oklahoma Sooners football players
New York Giants players
Atlanta Falcons players
Continental Football League players